Amblystegium serpens, also known as the creeping feathermoss or nano moss,  is a species of moss. It is a common species in Britain.

The species is pleurocarpous in form, with ovate to lanceolate leaves which end in a fine acute point. It forms creeping mats on decaying tree stumps, hedgebanks and other shaded sites.

It can live under water, and is used as a plant in some home aquariums.

References

 Watson, E. V. (1981) British Mosses and Liverworts 3rd edn. pp. 340–341

Bryophyta of New Zealand
Hypnales
Plants described in 1801